Brianne Davis is an American actress, producer and director, known for her roles in films Jarhead (2005), Prom Night (2008), and American Virgin (2009).

Life and career
Davis was born and raised in Atlanta and moved to Los Angeles in the early-1990s. She made her television debut with small part on the episode of Dawson's Creek in 2001, and in 2005 appeared in film Jarhead as Jake Gyllenhaal's character's girlfriend. In 2008, Davis co-starred in the slasher film Prom Night, and later appeared in American Virgin.

On television, Davis has guest-starred in Nip/Tuck, CSI: Crime Scene Investigation, Entourage, Desperate Housewives, Brothers & Sisters, Body of Proof, and True Blood, as well as appeared in recurring roles on Hollywood Heights, Murder in the First, True Blood, and If Loving You Is Wrong She continued appearing in low-profile horror films, like The Victim, ChromeSkull: Laid to Rest 2, and The Night Visitor. She also directed horror films The Night Visitor 2: Heather's Story and Psychophonia in 2014.

In 2016, Davis was cast as lead alongside Barry Sloane, Walton Goggins and Nadine Velazquez in the History Channel drama series Six created by William Broyles, Jr.

Filmography

Film

Television

References

External links 

Living people
Female models from Georgia (U.S. state)
American film actresses
American film directors
American film producers
American television actresses
Actresses from Atlanta
21st-century American actresses
American women film producers
Year of birth missing (living people)